José Ramón Hinojosa Montalvo (born in Valencia, Spain in 1947) is a historian and Professor of Medieval History at the University of Alicante in Spain. He is also Academic Correspondent of the Real Academia de la Historia.

Works 
 El Mediterráneo medieval (1999)
 The Jews in the Kingdom of València, from the persecution to expulsion (1993)
 Diccionario de historia medieval del Reino de Valencia (2002)

References 

Living people
20th-century Spanish historians
1947 births
Academic staff of the University of Alicante
21st-century Spanish historians